Opprebais Castle is a 13th-century fortified farmhouse (château-ferme) in Opprebais, Wallonia, in the municipality of Incourt, Walloon Brabant, Belgium.

See also
List of castles in Belgium

External links
BelgianCastles.be: Opprebais
Castles.nl: Opprebais

Castles in Belgium
Castles in Walloon Brabant
Incourt, Belgium